"No Foe Shall Gather Our Harvest" is a poem by Australian poet Mary Gilmore. It was first published in The Australian Women's Weekly on 29 June 1940, and later in the poet's collection Fourteen Men. The final two stanzas from the poem appear as microtext on the Australian ten-dollar note.

Outline
The poem is a "call to arms" to Australians, not in the sense of taking up weapons but more as a call to stand firm in the face of foreign aggression.  Each stanza ends with the same two lines (italicised in the original publication): "No foe shall gather our harvest/Or sit on our stockyard rail."

Analysis
The Oxford Companion to Australian Literature notes that at the time of publication, the poem "proved a remarkable morale booster in the tense days of the Japanese threat to Australia in 1942." They also note that it "was at the time considered as a possible battle hymn, even national anthem."

Further publications
 Fourteen Men by Mary Gilmore (1954)
 The Bulletin, 22 July 1980, p79 
 Two Centuries of Australian Poetry edited by Kathrine Bell (2007)
 The Book of Australian Popular Rhymed Verse : A Classic Collection of Entertaining and Recitable Poems and Verse : From Henry Lawson to Barry Humphries edited by Jim Haynes (2013)

See also
 1940 in poetry
 1940 in literature
 1940 in Australian literature
 Australian literature

References 

Australian poems
1940 poems